Coleophora tolli is a moth of the family Coleophoridae. It is found from Germany to the Pyrenees and Italy and from France to Slovakia.

The larvae mine Thymus species. They create a trivalved tubular silken case of 8-9.5 mm. The mouth angle is about 30°. The case is light brown and has a number of indistinct length lines. The mines are quite small at first, but later the leaves are completely mined out. Larvae can be found from autumn to June.

References

tolli
Moths of Europe
Moths described in 1951